{{Infobox information appliance
| name = iPad Pro (1st gen)
| logo = 
| image = 
| caption = 12.9" iPad Pro in Gold
| developer = Apple Inc.
| manufacturer = Foxconn (on contract)
| family = iPad
| type = Tablet computer
| predecessor = iPad Air 2
| successor = iPad Pro (2nd generation)
| discontinued = June 5, 2017
| media = 
| os = Original: iOS 9.1 (for 12.9-inch); iOS 9.3 (for 9.7-inch)
| power = 
| soc = Apple A9X with 64-bit architecture and Apple M9 motion co-processor
| cpu = 2.26 GHz dual-core 64-bit ARMv8-A
| memory = 12.9-inch: 4 GB LPDDR4 SDRAM9.7-inch: 2 GB LPDDR4 SDRAM
| storage = 32, 128, 256 GB flash memory
| display = 12.9-inch:2732×2048 px (264 PPI) (IPS panel) (5.5 megapixels), 12.9 in (327.8 mm) diagonal, 4:3
9.7-inch:2048×1536 px (264 PPI) (IPS panel) (3.1 megapixels), 9.7 in (246.3 mm) diagonal, 4:3
| graphics = 12-core PowerVR Series 7XT
| sound = Four speakers, adjusting sound to device orientation
| input = Multi-touch screen, headset controls and ambient light sensors, 3-axis accelerometer, 3-axis gyroscope, digital compass, five microphones, Bosch Sensortec BMP280 barometer
| controllers = 
| camera = 12.9-inch 1.2 megapixels 720p front-facing and 8 megapixels rear-facing
9.7-inch: 5 megapixels 720p front-facing and 12 megapixels 4K rear-facing
| touchpad = 
| connectivity = {{flatlist|
Wi-Fi and Wi-Fi + Cellular: Wi-Fi 802.11 a/b/g/n/ac; dual channel (2.4 GHz and 5 GHz); HT80 with MIMOBluetooth 4.2Wi-Fi + Cellular:  GPS & GLONASS
GSM
 
 850, 900, 1700, 1900, 2100 MHz
 
 850, 900, 1800, 1900 MHz
CDMA
 CDMA/EV-DO Rev. A and B.
 800, 1900 MHz
12.9-inch Wi-Fi + Cellular:
LTE
 Multiple bands
1, 2, 3, 4, 5, 7, 8, 13, 17, 18, 19, 20, 25, 26, 28, 29 and TD-LTE 38, 39, 40, 41
 9.7-inch Wi-Fi + Cellular:
LTE Advanced
 Multiple bands
 1, 2, 3, 4, 5, 7, 8, 12, 13, 17, 18, 19, 20, 25, 26, 27, 28, 29, 30 and TD-LTE 38, 39, 40, 41}}
| dimensions = 12.9-inch: (h) (w) (d)9.7-inch: (h) (w) (d)
| weight = 12.9-inch Wi-Fi:12.9-inch Wi-Fi + Cellular:9.7-inch Wi-Fi:9.7-inch Wi-Fi + Cellular:| compatibility = 
| related = Apple Pencil, Apple A9X
| website = 
| releasedate = 12.9-inch: 9.7-inch: 
| unitsshipped = 
| service = App Store, Apple Music, iTunes Store, iBookstore, iCloud, Game Center
}}

The first generation of iPad Pro' is a line of iPad tablet computers designed, developed, and marketed by Apple Inc, first sold in 2015 at a screen size of 12.9 inches. A smaller model, based on the form factor of the iPad Air 2, with a 9.7 inch screen, was announced on March 21, 2016, and released on March 31, 2016, alongside the first-generation iPhone SE. 

The 12.9 inch model was announced alongside the Apple Pencil, and both models were the first iPads to use the Pencil as an input device. The 12.9 inch iPad Pro is larger than all previous iPad models and was the first iPad to feature LPDDR4 RAM.

 Features 
The 12.9-inch version of the iPad Pro was announced during an Apple Special Event on September 9, 2015. It was released on November 11, 2015, with silver, gold, and space gray color options. Prices ranged from US$799 to $1,229, based on storage size and cellular connectivity. On March 21, 2016, the 9.7-inch version of the iPad Pro was announced at an Apple keynote with an additional rose gold color option. The 9.7-inch version also introduced the ability to choose the base 32 GB model  with a Cellular + WiFi option. Previously, Cellular + WiFi option was only available on 128 GB iPad Pro models. The 9.7-inch model is priced from $599 to $1,129 depending on the configuration. It was released on March 31, 2016.

The 9.7-inch iPad Pro has a faster CPU and a better camera than the iPad Air 2. It is the first iPad to feature True Tone Flash and Retina Flash, and its 256 GB storage option is the highest for an iPad at the time. Its True Tone display allows the LCD to adapt its color and intensity to ambient lighting.

Both iPad Pro models include the A9X chip and the Apple M9 motion co-processor. The 9.7-inch model, however, has a slightly underclocked CPU (2.16 GHz compared to 2.26 GHz on the 12.9-inch model) and only 2 GB of RAM. Several features are carried over from the standard iPad, such as Touch ID and the Retina Display. New features include a smart connector for a keyboard and four stereo speakers located in pairs on top and bottom of the device. The 12.9-inch model has a 2732-by-2048 display and the 9.7-inch model has a 2048-by-1536 display. Both displays have a resolution of 264 pixels per inch and feature a variable refresh rate, a first for Apple. The 12.9-inch version is also the first iOS device to include more than 2 GB of RAM.

A customized 12.9 inch iPad Pro was also designed by Jony Ive and submitted to the Time for Design auction. The special edition iPad Pro has an "Edition 1 of 1" label engraved on its back and comes with a custom yellow-gold anodized finish, a blue leather Smart Cover and an orange leather Apple Pencil case cover, all of which are not sold by Apple elsewhere.

Reception
Scott Stein from CNET praised the faster processor and new accessories available. However, he criticized the cost of both the unit and its accessories, while noting its slightly slower processor with less RAM of the 9.7-inch model compared to the larger 12.9-inch model. Matt Swider from TechRadar'' complimented the easy handling, large 256 GB configuration and True Tone display, but was upset about the high starting price. Gareth Beavis gave a positive review, commending the expansive screen and audio quality but stated that the battery life could be made longer.

Timeline

See also
 Pen computing
 Graphics tablet

References

External links

Pro
iPad Pro
Tablet computers
Touchscreen portable media players
Tablet computers introduced in 2015
Foxconn